Tony Stewart (born January 30, 1968) is a former running back in the Canadian Football League (CFL).

A graduate of University of Iowa, Stewart played 3 seasons with the Calgary Stampeders. His best season was 1994 when he rushed for 1120 yards and scored 19 touchdowns. He finished his career with the Hamilton Tiger-Cats.

References

1968 births
People from Chester, South Carolina
Players of American football from South Carolina
Living people
Calgary Stampeders players
Hamilton Tiger-Cats players
Canadian football running backs
Iowa Hawkeyes football players